Jorrit Smeets (born 25 March 1995) is a Dutch footballer who plays for Almere City in the Dutch Eerste Divisie.

Club career
Smeets made his professional debut in the Eerste Divisie for Fortuna Sittard on 26 September 2016 in a game against Jong PSV.

On 1 February 2021, Smeets signed with Dutch club Almere City.

References

External links
 
 
 Career stats & Profile - Voetbal International

Living people
1995 births
People from Landgraaf
Association football midfielders
Dutch footballers
Fortuna Sittard players
Almere City FC players
Eerste Divisie players
Eredivisie players
Footballers from Limburg (Netherlands)